William Todd Hamilton (born October 18, 1965) is an American professional golfer. He is best known for his victory at the 2004 Open Championship.

Early life
Hamilton was born in the small west-central Illinois city of Galesburg. He grew up in an even smaller town, Oquawka, in Henderson County on the Mississippi River. He attended Union High School in Biggsville, Illinois and the University of Oklahoma, where he played collegiately.

Professional career
Hamilton turned professional in 1987 but was unable to gain entrance to the PGA Tour. Instead he played internationally for many years, primarily on the Japan Golf Tour after gaining his card as winner of the 1992 Asia Golf Circuit Order of Merit winner. When he left the Japan Golf Tour after 12 seasons, he was the tour's 2nd all-time leading non-Japanese money winner (to USA's David Ishii), with earnings of over 630 million yen (about $6.18 million in 2014 US dollars) with 11 tour wins.

After eight tries, at the age of 38, Hamilton went back to Qualifying School in 2003, where he finally earned his first PGA Tour card.

Hamilton won his first PGA Tour event at the 2004 Honda Classic. He birdied the final two holes to beat Davis Love III by one stroke at 12 under par. Later that year, Hamilton won a major championship in one of golf's all-time upsets when he defeated Ernie Els in a four-hole playoff to win The Open Championship at Royal Troon Golf Club. After shooting an opening round 71, Hamilton fired a second round 67 to move to -4 and  a fifth-place tie with future World Golf Hall of Famers Els, Vijay Singh and Colin Montgomerie as well as Michael Campbell. Hamilton again shot a 67 in the third round to take a one-shot lead over Els. Entering the tournament's 72nd hole, Hamilton held a one-shot lead over Els, but Hamilton bogeyed the 18th hole, leaving Els with a 12-foot birdie putt for the win, which he missed. Els and Hamilton headed for the four-hole aggregate playoff, in which Hamilton carded four pars while Els managed three pars and a bogey, and Hamilton took the win.

These two victories in his first season on the PGA Tour led to Hamilton being named the 2004 PGA Tour Rookie of the Year and reaching a peak world ranking of 16. In his 187 subsequent tour starts, he  missed the cut 111 times and had just three top-10 finishes. In 2006, Hamilton captained the American team in ITV's celebrity golf tournament, the All*Star Cup.

He lost his full exempt status on the PGA Tour in 2010. Hamilton played on the Web.com Tour in 2014 and 2015. Hamilton became eligible to play  on  the  Champions Tour after turning fifty years of age in October 2015.

Personal life
Hamilton lives in Westlake, Texas.

Professional wins (17)

PGA Tour wins (2)

PGA Tour playoff record (1–0)

Japan Golf Tour wins (11)

Japan Golf Tour playoff record (1–4)

Asia Golf Circuit wins (2)

Other wins (2)
1992 Rolex Masters (Singapore)
1999 Oklahoma Open

Major championships

Wins (1)

1Defeated Ernie Els in 4-hole playoff; Hamilton (4-4-3-4=15), Els (4-4-4-4=16).

Results timeline

CUT = missed the half way cut
"T" indicates a tie for a place.

Summary

Most consecutive cuts made – 4 (2007 PGA – 2008 Open Championship)
Longest streak of top-10s – 1

Results in The Players Championship

CUT = missed the halfway cut
"T" indicates a tie for a place

Results in World Golf Championships

QF, R16, R32, R64 = Round in which player lost in match play
"T" = Tied

Results in senior major championships
Results not in chronological order before 2017.

"T" indicates a tie for a place
CUT = missed the halfway cut
NT = No tournament due to COVID-19 pandemic

See also
2003 PGA Tour Qualifying School graduates
List of golfers with most Japan Golf Tour wins

References

External links

Article about "outsider" Open Winners

American male golfers
Oklahoma Sooners men's golfers
PGA Tour golfers
Japan Golf Tour golfers
PGA Tour Champions golfers
Winners of men's major golf championships
Golfers from Illinois
Golfers from Texas
People from Galesburg, Illinois
People from Westlake, Texas
1965 births
Living people